Robert Léon (born c.1907) was a French rower. He competed in the men's eight event at the 1948 Summer Olympics.

References

External links
 

Year of birth uncertain
Year of death missing
French male rowers
Olympic rowers of France
Rowers at the 1948 Summer Olympics
Place of birth missing